Alberto Gieco is an Argentine movie maker and educator born in Santa Clara De Buena Vista, Santa Fe, Argentina in 1952.  He is mainly active in Brazil and North America. He is a retired professor who taught at Occidental College in Los Angeles and several other schools in Southern California. He has one son, named Giovanni Gieco, who is a writer and actor. He is also cousins and friends with Argentinian folk legend Leon Gieco known as the "Argentine Bob Dylan".

He has been the director and first assistant director for numerous films. He also produced and directed the documentary film Punks, one of, if not the first documentary covering the emergent Punk scene in São Paulo, in the late 1970s and early 1980s. A list of his better known works includes:
 Chuck and Buck (2000) - Production Supervisor
 Adios East Los (1999) - Assistant Director
 Liar's Poker (1999) - Assistant Director
 First Love, Last Rites (1998) - Assistant Director
 They Come at Night (1998) - Assistant Director
 How to Make the Cruelest Month (1997) - Associate Producer
 At Play in the Fields of the Lord (1991) -  First Assistant Director

References

External links 

 
 https://web.archive.org/web/20120421221835/http://csmp.ucop.edu/users/view/110/site/18/project/cflp/alberto-gieco
 http://www.fandango.com/albertogieco/filmography/p213117

Living people
1952 births
Argentine film directors